Happy Easter is a 1984 French comedy film directed by Georges Lautner.

Cast 
Jean-Paul Belmondo as Stéphane Margelle
Sophie Marceau as Julie
Marie Laforêt as Sophie Margelle
Rosy Varte as Marlène Chataigneau, Julie's mother
Michel Beaune as Rousseau
Marie-Christine Descouard as Melle Fleury

References

External links 

Happy Easter at Le Film Guide

1984 comedy films
1984 films
Films directed by Georges Lautner
French comedy films
1980s French-language films
1980s French films